The CR400AF Fuxing is a Chinese electric high-speed train that was developed by CNR Changchun Railway Vehicles and manufactured by CRRC Qingdao Sifang. Development on the project started in 2012, and the design plan was finished in September 2014. The first EMU rolled off the production line on 30 June 2015. The series received its current designation of Fuxing in June 2017, with the nickname Blue Dolphin.

This train will also operate in Indonesia on the Jakarta-Bandung high-speed railway from 2023, with the derivative version known as KCIC400AF or Komodo Merah (literally: red komodo dragon).

Variants
All variants of the Fuxing train are compatible. The EMU models share the same standard required by China Railway Corporation, hence the name China Standardized EMU. Fuxing train models can be identified by the designation. The number in the designation represents the speed class in kilometers per hour. The first letter after the speed is the manufacturer code, with A being the CRRC Qingdao Sifang and B being the CRRC Changchun Railway Vehicles. The second letter after the speed represents whether the train set is powered by self-propelled multiple units or locomotives. Additional variants can be identified with the letter after the dash: No letter indicates the standard 8-car configuration. A indicates a 16-car configuration; B indicates 17-car configurations; C indicates 8-car multiple units with automatic train operation capability; G indicates 8-car sandstorm and cold climate resistant trainset; and Z indicates 8-car configuration with redesigned interior and exterior. Some variants have two letters indicating combined configuration, such as type GZ being the train set featuring extreme weather resistant capability (type G) and redesigned interior and exterior (type Z). 
It is manufactured by CRRC Qingdao Sifang.
 KCIC400AF/AF-CIT
 Exported derivative of the CR400AF for Jakarta-Bandung high speed line.
CR400AF–A 16-car version manufactured by CRRC Qingdao Sifang. The first CR400AF-A started operation in July 2018 on the Beijing–Shanghai high-speed railway.
CR400AF–B 17-car version manufactured by CRRC Qingdao Sifang. Testing started in 2018 and entered passenger service in 2019 in response to high passenger demand on the Beijing–Shanghai high-speed railway.
CR400AF–C 8-car ATO enabled version with redesigned interior and exterior. It is manufactured by CRRC Qingdao Sifang.
CR400AF–G 8-car sandstorm and cold climate resistant version. It is manufactured by CRRC Qingdao Sifang.
CR400AF–Z 8-car variant with redesigned and upgraded interior and exterior. It is manufactured by CRRC Qingdao Sifang.
CR400AF–BZ 17-car variant with redesigned and upgraded interior and exterior. It is manufactured by CRRC Qingdao Sifang.
CR400AF–GZ 8-car sandstorm/cold resistant with redesigned and upgraded interior and exterior. It is manufactured by CRRC Qingdao Sifang.

Specification

Gallery

See also 
 China Railway CR400BF
 China Railway High-speed, Chinese high-speed railway service provided by China Railway.
 China Railway, Chinese state-owned corporation that operates all Fuxing trains.
 Fuxing (train), the train brand CR400AF is part of.

References

High-speed trains of China
Electric multiple units of China
Passenger trains running at least at 350 km/h in commercial operations
CRRC multiple units
25 kV AC multiple units